Nandini is a South Asian female given name. It is derived from the Sanskrit verbal root nand, which means "to rejoice, delight". Literally, nandinī means a woman who brings joy. The name also specifically refers to a daughter, as a daughter brings joy to the family. In the Hindu religion, Goddess Parvati is often addressed by this name. Nandini also refers to one of the eight eternal companions (Ashtanayika) of Goddes Parvati.

People
The following people named Nandini have articles on Wikipedia:
Nandini Bhaktavatsala, Indian actress, won the National Film Award for Best Actress for her performance in the Kannada film, Kaadu
Nandini Ghosal, Indian Bengali classical dancer and actress
Nandini Goud (born 1967), painter and printmaker from Hyderabad, India
Nandini Mundkur, Indian developmental paediatrician
Nandini Muthuswamy, Carnatic violinist from South India
Hamsa Nandini, Indian model, dancer, actress
Nandini Nimbkar, American academic from India, current President of the Nimbkar Agricultural Research Institute (NARI)
Nandini Rai (born 1988), Indian model and film actress
Nandini Reddy, Indian film director
Nandini Sidda Reddy, Telugu language writer and poet
Nandini Sahu (born 1973), Indian poet
Nandini Satpathy (1931–2006), Indian politician and author
Rajesh Nandini Singh (born 1967), Indian politician in the Indian National Congress
Nandini Srikar, Indian singer, composer and guitarist

Fictional character 
 Nandini, a fictional Maurya queen in the TV series Chandra Nandini

Other uses 

 Nandini, a TV Series that airs on Sun TV (India)

See also
Nadini
Nand (disambiguation)
Nandakini
Nandi (disambiguation)
Nanini (disambiguation)

References